Professor Jilani Kamran (born Ghulam Jilani; 24 August 1926  22 February 2003), also spelled Gilani Kamran, was a Pakistani poet, critic, teacher, and the head of Forman Christian College at English department. He wrote about thirty-five books, comprising poems and some uncertain genres, he is also credited for translating the publications of a 9th century's Sufi poet Khwaja Ghulam Farid into English.

Early life and education 
He was born as Ghulam Jilani in Poonch district of Jammu and Kashmir princely state, British India. He did his master's in English from the University of Punjab and Master of Arts (Hons) from the University of Edinburgh.

He served in various education departments since his first appointment in 1958 at the Government College University, Lahore. He initially served as a teacher until 1973. He was later transferred to the Government College Asghar Mall Rawalpindi and served as principal from 1973 until he was transferred in 1975 to the Government Shalimar College at Baghbanpura where he served until 1979. Later in 1979, he was appointed as head of the Forman Christian College (formerly F. C. College) for English department until he retired in 1986.

Literary work 
Jilani started his career around 1958 when he was appointed as a teacher. He primarily wrote Sufi devotional poems, and was influenced by the contemporary European literature. His some authorship include Nai Nazm kay Taqazay, Ibn-e-Arabi, and Mansur Hallaj among other publications, including some books on mysticism. He wrote in both Urdu and English languages, and is often recognized for introducing new genres of nazms to Urdu poetry with the help of romantic and Arabic poetry.

Publications

Awards

Death and legacy
Jilani was suffering from hypertension medical condition, and was subsequently admitted to a hospital. He died of brain haemorrhage on 23 February 2003 in Lahore, Pakistan, and is buried in Nishtar Block cemetery, Lahore. Among the survivors are his wife, three sons and a daughter.

Jilani Kamran was considered an authority on English and Urdu literature in Pakistan and was a life-member of the Pakistan Academy of Letters. He was often invited to participate in PTV literary programmes and also was a frequent newspaper columnist in many Pakistani newspapers.

On 9 March 2003, an event was organized in Jilani Kamran's memory by the Halqa-e Arbab-e Zauq, Islamaabad where many contemporary Pakistani scholars paid him tributes.

References

External links 
 Gilani Kamran at Government College University, Lahore
 Jilani Kamran at Rekhta Foundation

 
1926 births
2003 deaths
University of the Punjab alumni
Alumni of the University of Edinburgh
Poets from Lahore
Urdu-language poets from Pakistan
English-language writers from Pakistan
Pakistani literary critics
Recipients of the Pride of Performance
Recipients of Tamgha-e-Imtiaz
Recipients of Tamgha-e-Quaid-e-Azam
Recipients of the Adamjee Literary Award